You and Me Against the World is the fifth studio album from Norwegian electronic rock music band Apoptygma Berzerk. The album was released in 2005, and gave way to a very different sound in the band, whereas previous records had a more traditional electric synthpop/EBM sound, You and Me Against the World features a more mainstream, rock-oriented sound. It is the band's most successful album to date.

Track listing

Charts

References

2005 albums
Apoptygma Berzerk albums
Metropolis Records albums